Events from the year 1861 in art.

Events
 February – Hilda Sjölin opens a photography studio in Malmö, making her one of the first known Swedish female professional photographers.
 July 15 – English painter Joanna Mary Boyce dies aged 29 from complications following the birth of her third child, leaving her paintings Bird of God and Undine uncompleted (the latter being finished by her widower Henry Tanworth Wells); Dante Gabriel Rossetti makes a drawing of her on her deathbed.
date unknown 
Paul Cézanne arrives in Paris to join his friend Émile Zola; while there he meets Camille Pissarro.
Berthe Morisot becomes a pupil of Corot.
Édouard Manet has his first paintings accepted by the Salon (Paris) (The Spanish Singer and Portrait of M. and Mme. Auguste Manet).
Morris, Marshall, Faulkner & Co., "Fine Art Workmen in Painting, Carving, Furniture and the Metals", set up in London by William Morris, P. P. Marshall, Charles Faulkner, Ford Madox Brown, Edward Burne-Jones, Dante Gabriel Rossetti and Philip Webb to craft Pre-Raphaelite-inspired furnishings.
William Bell Scott concludes his series of murals of Northumbrian history at Wallington Hall with Iron and Coal, the Nineteenth Century.

Works

 Lawrence Alma-Tadema – The Education of the Children of Clovis
 Richard Ansdell – The Hunted Slaves
 John Bell – Crimean War Memorial (London)
 Auguste Bonheur – La Sortie du pâturage ("The Way to Market")
 Joanna Mary Boyce
 Bird of God
 Head of a Mulatto Woman
 Frederic Edwin Church
 The Icebergs
 Oosisoak
 Jean-Léon Gérôme – Phryne before the Areopagus
 Gustave Achille Guillaumet – Arab Ploughing with Camels in the Evening Landscape
 James Clarke Hook – Compass'd by the Inviolate Sea
 Thomas Dow Jones – Abraham Lincoln (bust)
 Daniel Maclise – The Meeting of Wellington and Blücher after the Battle of Waterloo (wall painting in Palace of Westminster, 1860-61)
 Édouard Manet
 Boy Carrying a Sword
 La Nymphe surprise
 Albert Joseph Moore – The Mother of Sisera Looked out a Window
 John Morgan – Gentlemen of the Jury
 Joseph Noel Paton – Dawn: Luther at Erfurt – Justification by Faith
 Franz Xaver Reich – Mother Kinzig
 Dante Gabriel Rossetti
 Fair Rosamund
 Lucrezia Borgia
 Rebecca Solomon
 The Arrest of a Deserter
 The Young Teacher
 Karl von Piloty – Nero Dancing Upon the Ruins of Rome
 Karl Ferdinand Wimar – murals in Rotunda of Courthouse, St. Louis, Missouri

Births
 January 21 – Đorđe Jovanović, Serbian sculptor (died 1953)
 February 1 – Jacques-Émile Blanche, French painter (died 1942)
 April 9 – Charles Holroyd, English etcher (died 1917)
 June 19 – Carl Seffner, German portrait sculptor (died 1932)
 June 29 – Pedro Figari, Uruguayan painter, lawyer, writer and politician (died 1938)
 July 18 – Lucien Simon, French painter and teacher (died 1945)
 August 9 – J. W. Godward, English Neoclassical painter (suicide 1922)
 August 17 – Ludwig von Hofmann, German Impressionist painter (died 1945)
 October 4 – Frederic Remington, American painter, illustrator, sculptor and writer (died 1909)
 October 30 – Antoine Bourdelle, French sculptor (died 1929)
 December 8
 Aristide Maillol, French sculptor, painter and printmaker (died 1944)
 Georges Méliès, French filmmaker (died 1938)
 December 16 – Antonio de La Gándara, French painter, pastellist and draughtsman (died 1917)
 December 20 – Ivana Kobilca, Slovene realist painter (died 1926)
 date unknown – Kiyohara Tama, Sicily-based Japanese painter (died 1939)

Deaths
 January 11 – Karl Altmann, German painter (born 1802)
 February 3 – Ferdinand Deppe, German naturalist, explorer and painter (born 1794)
 February 7 – Eduard Clemens Fechner, German portrait painter and an etcher (born 1799)
 February 9 – Francis Danby, Irish-born landscape painter (born 1793)
 March 10 (February 26 O.S.) – Taras Shevchenko, Ukrainian poet and artist (born 1814)
 April 14 – Utagawa Kuniyoshi, Japanese artist of the ukiyo-e style of woodblock prints and painting (born 1797)
 May 21 – Benjamin Paul Akers, American sculptor (born 1825)
 July 15 – Joanna Mary Boyce, English portrait, genre and landscape painter (born 1831)
 August 17 – Johann David Passavant, German painter and art curator (born 1787)
 September 22 – Alexei Yegorov, Russian painter (born 1776)
 November 26 – Wilhelm Hensel, German painter, husband of Fanny Hensel (born 1794)
 December 24 – Jean-Antoine-Siméon Fort, French oil and watercolor painter (born 1793)
 December 25 - Jacobus Josephus Eeckhout, Belgian historical and genre subjects painter (born 1793)
 date unknown – Andrew Hunt, English landscape painter (born 1790)

References

 
Years of the 19th century in art
1860s in art